The Four Companions is a 1938 German drama film directed by Carl Froelich and starring Ingrid Bergman, Sabine Peters and Carsta Löck. Jochen Huth adapted the script from his own play. It was shot at the Tempelhof Studios in Berlin with sets designed by the art director Franz Schroedter. The film was intended as a star vehicle to launch Bergman's career in Germany following her success in several Swedish films.

Synopsis
After graduation, four female art students attempt to set up their own advertising agency.

Cast
 Ingrid Bergman as Marianne Kruge
 Sabine Peters as Käthe Winter
 Carsta Löck as Lotte Waag
 Ursula Herking as Franziska
 Hans Söhnker as Stefan Kohlund
 Leo Slezak as Professor Lange
 Erich Ponto as Regierungsrat Alfred Hintze
 Heinz Welzel as Feinmechaniker Martin Bachmann
 Rudolf Klicks as Direktor der graphischen Berufsschule
 Karl Haubenreißer as Direktor der Seidenstrumpffabrik
 Lotte Braun as Sekretärin des Fabrikdirektors
 Wilhelm P. Krüger as Maurermeister am Neubau
 Willi Rose as Straßenbahnschaffner
 Max Rosenhauer as Hauswart
 Ernst G. Schiffner as Geschäftsmann, der keinen Auftrag erteilt
 Hans Juergen Weidlich as Berliner Jüngling an der Litfaßsäule
 Kurt Mikulski as Ausstellungsdiener
 Fritz Lafontaine as 1. Grafikschüler
 Gustaf Dennert as 2. Grafikschüler
 Zarah Leander as Singer
 Traute Bengen
 Hugo Froelich

References

Bibliography

External links 
 

1938 films
Films of Nazi Germany
German drama films
German black-and-white films
1938 drama films
1930s German-language films
Films set in Berlin
Films directed by Carl Froelich
German films based on plays
Films about fictional painters
Films about advertising
UFA GmbH films
1930s German films
Films shot at Tempelhof Studios